Catholicos Gregory IX Mousabegian was the Catholicos of the Armenian Apostolic Church at Cilicia between 1439 and 1446.

Biography
During his reign a movement began to return the Catholicate of All Armenians to historical Armenia. In 1441 at Vagharshapat (also known as Etchmiadzin), with the participation of more than 300 religious and lay delegates, an election of a new Catholicos look place while the Catholicos of All Armenians Gregory IX was living in Cilicia.

It is a riddle of history on what basis the election of a new Catholicos took place in Vagharshapat. It is unknown if Gregory was invited to return to Etchmiadzin and refused or if he suggested that a new Catholicos be elected there. Some authorities in the 18th century suggested that this was the case and that the Catholicos said, "I will remain here and die and after my death the See of Sis will cease to exist of its own accord." Exact circumstances may never be known.

Some lists of the Armenian Catholicoi list him as only reigning for two years and consider him deposed after the 1441 election.

Whatever the case, he continued to reign as Catholicos in Cilicia until his death in 1446 and was succeeded as Catholicos at Cilicia by Garabed II and there have been two Catholicoi of the Armenian Apostolic Church ever since.

Catholicoi of Cilicia
1446 deaths
Armenian Oriental Orthodox Christians
Year of birth unknown
15th-century Oriental Orthodox archbishops